HMS Wem was a Hunt-class minesweeper of the Royal Navy from World War I. She was originally to be named Walmer, but was renamed 25 June 1918 to avoid possible misunderstandings of having vessels named after coastal locations.

See also 
 Wem, Shropshire

References 
 

 

Hunt-class minesweepers (1916)
Royal Navy ship names
1919 ships